The Nova Corps is a fictional intergalactic military/police force appearing in American comic books published by Marvel Comics. Created by writer Marv Wolfman, the Corps first appeared in Fantastic Four #205 (April 1979). They have since appeared in numerous other Marvel stories set in outer space and media adaptations, such as the animated TV series The Super Hero Squad Show and the 2014 film Guardians of the Galaxy, the latter of which is set in the Marvel Cinematic Universe.

Publication history
The team was created by writer Marv Wolfman. Richard Rider, the first member, appeared in The Man Called Nova #1 (September 1976). The Corps first appeared in Fantastic Four #205 (April 1979)

Fictional organization history
The Nova Corps were originally a space military and exploration group for the planet Xandar. It consisted of 500 soldiers ranging in rank from Corpsman up to Centurion and its leader Centurion Nova Prime. The source of the Nova Corps power is called the Nova Force which is an unlimited energy generated by a living computer called the Xandarian Worldmind. The Nova Corps police the known universe, under the directive of the Pans World Treaty.

The Nova Corps and Xandar were destroyed three times: once by the alien Zorr, once by the space pirate Nebula, and once by the Annihilation Wave. They also had a costly war with the Skrulls.

During the Skrull's Secret Invasion of Earth, the Nova Corps were formed a fourth time to help Nova Prime Richard Rider defend the Project Pegasus building from the Skrulls. Their base of operations was inside Ego the Living Planet, rechristened "Nu-Xandar".

During the Kree-Shi'ar War, the Xandarian Worldmind starts recruiting new members to the Nova Corps without telling Richard. Upon learning that Ego the Living Planet is one of the Nova Corps, Richard speaks against this to the Xandarian Worldmind. Richard is stripped of his rank and discharged from the Nova Corps. After most of the new recruits are slaughtered by the Shi'ar's Imperial Guard, Ego is discharged from the Nova Corps and Richard is reinstated. Afterwards, Richard agrees to train the remaining recruits, which also includes his younger brother Robert.

During the war with the Cancerverse, Richard takes the Nova Force from the other recruits to use against Thanos. Richard apparently dies before returning it, leaving the Nova Corps powerless.

When the Phoenix Force returns to Earth in a lead-up to the Avengers vs. X-Men storyline, a new centurion named Sam Alexander arrives to help the Avengers stop it.

It was later revealed that there was a black ops version of the Nova Corps called the Supernovas (AKA the Black Novas).

During the Original Sin storyline, Sam learned from the eye of the murdered Uatu the Watcher that the membership of the Supernovas consisted of thieves and killers. He later discovered that although The Black Novas began with corrupt Novas stealing the Nova Force, they eventually became a sanctioned, special forces arm of the Nova Corps.

The Nova Corps is shown to be rebuilding itself, with new recruits and old members, in the 2017 volume of the 'All New Guardians of the Galaxy'.

The Nova Force
The Nova Force is the source of power for Nova and the entire Nova Corps, generated and controlled by the Living Computers of Xandar called the Xandarian Worldmind. The amount of Nova Force a Nova Corp member can access is determined by their rank. The higher the rank, the more power they can access. It has been observed, such as the case of Garthan Saal, that some exposures to the Nova Force can induce madness and mental instability with prolonged exposure to extremely high levels.

The Nova Force can grant the recipient (to varying degrees depending upon rank) various abilities including superhuman strength, speed, reflexes, and perception. It also grants flight at faster than light speed, a healing factor, and energy powers. These energy powers include the ability to create an electromagnetic beam or a gravimetric pulse. It can also be used to create stargates. The link to the Worldmind allows the wearer to access enemy profiles, analyze an attacker's strengths and weaknesses, interface with computers, analyze energy signatures, create shields against mental attacks and receive transmissions from nearby sources.

As a corpsman, Richard Rider utilized some Nova costumes/battle suits designed by his New Warriors teammate Dwayne Taylor. These suits had various additional abilities. Other corpsmen have been observed using traditional weapons, such as firearms.

Nova Corps ranks
The Nova Corps are ranks from the highest rank to the lowest rank:
 Nova Prime – The Nova Centurion designated as 'Prime' is the highest-ranking member of the Nova Corps. The Nova Prime is endowed with a vast portion of the Nova-Force, and capable of great feats of energy manipulation and projection. Nova Prime is currently Richard Rider.
 Syfon Warriors - The Syfon Warriors are a special regiment of the Nova Corps. The Syfons have the ability to drain and redirect energy from others. Syfons are considered just below the Nova Prime in rank. Despite this high rank they appear to harness much less of the Nova Force than officers below them in rank.
 Centurion – The Centurions are the top tier of the Nova Corps. It is from the Centurions that the Centurion Nova Prime is selected. The Centurions can lift approximately 20 tons.
 Denarians – The Denarians are the middle tier of the Nova Corps. They have access to 75% of the Nova Force compared to the Centurions. The Denarians can lift approximately 15 tons.
 Millennians – The Millennians have 50% of the Nova Force compared to the Centurions. They cannot fly, but they can pilot one-man sky flyers. Millennians can lift approximately 10 tons, have limited invulnerability, and have small photon blasters in the armbands of their uniform.
 Corpsman – The Corpsman are the entry level of the Nova Corps. Any graduates from the Space Academy must apply to the Nova Corps upon graduation. They have access to 25% of the Nova Force compared to the Centurions. They can lift approximately 5 tons with limited invulnerability. Like the Millennians, the Corpsman have small photon blasters in the armbands of their uniform.

Known members
 Adora – Adora is the Queen of Xandar. Although she is killed in Nebula's attack on Xandar, she is cloned by the Xandarian Worldmind. She held the title of Prime Commandant of the Corps, but her current whereabouts are unknown.
 Air-Walker (Gabriel Lan) – Lan is Xandarian member of the military and exploratory force. He is elected by Galactus to serve as a herald, but dies in battle. He is later restored to life in an android body.
 Jesse Alexander - Jesse Alexander is a former Nova Corpsman from Earth and father of Sam Alexander. He's currently held prisoner on a still unknown planet by the Chitauri. He was also a member of the Supernovas (AKA the Black Novas).
 Sam Alexander – Sam Alexander is the newest member of the Nova Corps from Earth. He becomes a member of the Corps when his father, Jesse Alexander, leaves behind his Nova helmet. He is the main character in Nova (vol. 5).
 Josh Atwater – Atwater is a human member of the Nova Corpsmen. He is killed in action during the War of Kings.
 Anwen Bakian –
 Eve Bakian –
 Fayne Bakian –
 Menzin Bakian –
 Collapsar (Manu Chauhan) – (Earth-15061) Manu Chauhan is a member of the Nova Micro Corps.
Rhomann Dey - Dey is the former Nova Prime from Xandar who recruited Richard Rider. He kills Zorr before dying himself.
 Guy Dimond –
 Kyle Dyne – Dyne is a Nova Corpsman. His only appearance is in Nova (vol. 4) #25 (July 2009).
 Firelord (Pyreus Kril) – Kril was a Xandarian member of the military and exploratory force who is Selected by Galactus to serve as a herald. He is last seen hunting down those responsible for his planet's destruction.
 Fraktur – Fraktur is a Kakarantharian with the rank of Nova Millennian and the cousin of Fin Fang Foom.
 David Green – Green's only appearance is in Nova (vol. 4) #25 (July 2009).
 Grot – Grot is a Nova Centurion who is killed battling Kraa.
 Hannah –
 Kaseem –
 Ko-Rel – Ko-Rel is a Nova Corpsman drafted during the "Conquest" attack on the Kree. She is killed after a brief, but heroic stint as a Corpsman. Her essence is used as a template for the Corps' interface with the Xandarian Worldmind.
 K'Thol - was a Nova Corpsman who was killed and eaten by giant alien spiders. 
 Lucas Maats – Maats is a human who joins the Nova Corpsmen under the Xandarian Worldmind. He is blasted apart by a laser during the War of Kings storyline.
 Mantid – 
 Matu Makalani – Makalani is one of the humans drafted as a Corpsman in the Nova Corps by the Xandarian Worldmind. He is killed by a blast from a Shi'ar Destroyer.
 Morrow – Morrow is a Mephitisoid, former Nova Centurion, current Nova Millennian who was secretly recruited by the Xandarian Worldmind.
 Muraitak – Muraitak is a Skrull  Nova Corpsman
 Lindy Nolan – Nolan is one of the humans drafted as a Novs Corpsman by the Xandarian Worldmind.
 Nova Omega (Garthan Saal) – Saal is a survivor of the second destruction of Xandar. He is driven insane by the full power of the Nova Corps.
 Nu-Xandar – A unification of Ego the Living Planet and the Xandarian Worldmind. 
 Tre Owens – Owens, Nova 232324-5, is one of the humans drafted as a Corpsman in the Nova Corps by the Xandarian Worldmind. 
 Zan Philo – Philo is an unidentified alien with the rank of Nova Centurion. His left arm is replaced with both a mechanical arm and an alien one.
 Powerhouse (Rieg Davan) - Powerhouse was trained as a member of the Syfon Division of the Corps. After recovering from amnesia and being brainwashed by Condor on Earth, he returns to his planet Xandar as one of the Champions of Xandar. He is killed when Nebula destroys his world.
 Pyo – Pyo is a Rigellian Nova Centurion. She is killed when the Annihilation Wave attacks Xandar.
 Quasar (Wendell Vaughn) – Quasar is temporarily drafted during the war with the Cancerverse.
 Qubit – Qubit is a synthorganic being, one of the Manufactured Harmonites. He is one of the Nova Corpsman secretly recruited by the Xandarian Worldmind.
 Irani Rael – Rael is a Rigellian Nova Centurion who is secretly recruited by the Xandarian Worldmind.
 Rael Rider – 
 Richard Rider – Rider is the Nova Centurion Prime (11249-44396) until he is apparently killed when Thanos brings Death to the Cancerverse.
 Robert Rider – Rider is the brother of Richard Rider who is made a member by the Xandarian Worldmind after he helps to revive it. He is currently a member of the Fraternity of Raptors known as Talonar. In another timeline he was the one originally chosen to replace Rhomann Dey and became Nova 0:0
 Samaya – Samaya is a Nova Centurion from Centauri-IV. She is killed by the Annihilation Wave.
 Freya Shane – Shane is a Nova Corpsman. Her only appearance is in Nova (vol. 4) #25 (July 2009).
 Malik Tarcel – Tarcel is a Shi'ar who is chosen to replace Richard Rider as Nova Prime when he is expelled from the Corps.
 Tasver – 
 Tas'Wzta – Tas'Wzta is a D'Bari Nova Centurion. He is killed when Kraa's ship explodes.
 Zyziwc Tiel – Tiel is a Nova Corpsman. His only appearance is in Nova (vol. 4) #25 (July 2009).
 Torthar – Torthar is a Nova Centurion who is killed by Kraa.
 Tanak Valt – Valt is the Xandarian who founds the Nova Corps and leads the Champions of Xandar. He and his wife Queen Adora are killed when Nebula destroys their world.
 Suki Yumiko – Yumiko is one of the humans drafted as a Corpsman in the Nova Corps by the Xandarian Worldmind. She is tortured and killed by Xenith (Gladiator's cousin).
 Zigzag –

NOTE: The Nova Corps has also been affiliated with groups known as the Champions of Xandar, and Supernovas (AKA the Black Novas).

In other media

Television
 An unidentified Nova Corps member appears as a background character in several episodes of Silver Surfer while Richard Rider makes a cameo in the episode "Learning Curve" Pt. 1.
 The Nova Corps appear in The Super Hero Squad Show episode "So Pretty When They Explode". They fight Thanos when he targets them to get the Power Gem, only to be defeated and Nova Prime taken hostage.
 The Sam Alexander incarnation of Nova appears as a main character in Ultimate Spider-Man. In the episode "Return of the Guardians of the Galaxy", the eponymous team, Nova, and Spider-Man face off against ex-Nova Corps member, Titus. Sam claims to be all that is left of the Corps, but this statement is never elaborated upon.
 The Nova Corps appear in Guardians of the Galaxy. Among the known Nova Corps members are Rhomann Dey, Titus, and Irani Rael. The design of the Nova Soldiers resembles the MCU incarnations, but their helmets resemble those of the comics. The second season introduces the Nova Centurions, a secret, elite division of the Nova Corps who utilized the Nova Force to protect Adam Warlock or destroy him if he turned evil, in flashbacks as none remained until Sam Alexander eventually becomes one of the first in generations to wear a Nova Centurion helmet.

Film
The Nova Corps appear in live-action films set in the Marvel Cinematic Universe (MCU).
 They first appear in the 2014 film Guardians of the Galaxy. Glenn Close portrays Nova Prime Irani Rael, while John C. Reilly and Peter Serafinowicz play high-ranking officers Corpsman Rhomann Dey and Denarian Garthan Saal. The Nova Corps arrest Star-Lord, Gamora, Rocket, and Groot on Xandar after they cause a public disturbance and send them to a secure prison called the Kyln. The four criminals and Drax later form the Guardians of the Galaxy and help stop Ronan the Accuser's attack on Xandar. The Nova Corps expunge the Guardians' criminal records in gratitude and place the Power Stone in a secure vault for safekeeping.
 This version of the Corps acts as a traditional police force, with no mention of the Nova force. When asked about a Nova solo movie, director James Gunn said "I think there is always a chance of a Nova movie."
 The Nova Corps are implied to have been annihilated in Avengers: Infinity War alongside the local populace by Thanos when he invaded and decimated Xandar in search of the Power Stone prior to the film's events.
 Deadline Hollywood reported that Marvel are now developing a project centered around Nova with Sabir Pirzada writing, but it's unclear if it will be a movie or a television series.

Video games
 The Nova Corps appear in Guardians of the Galaxy: The Telltale Series.

 The Nova Corps as well the Worldmind appear in Marvel's Guardians of the Galaxy, with Richard Rider mentioned several times.

References

External links
 Nova Corps at Marvel.com
 Nova Corps at Marvel Wiki
 Nova Corps at Comic Vine

Marvel Comics extraterrestrial superheroes
Marvel Comics superhero teams
Fictional organizations in Marvel Comics
Characters created by Marv Wolfman
Fictional law enforcement agencies
Fiction about intergalactic travel
Fiction set in the Andromeda Galaxy